31st October is an Indian Hindi-language historical action drama film directed by Shivaji Lotan Patil and written by Amit Tuli and Harry Sachdeva and produced by Harry Sachdeva. The film, based on a true story, focuses on the aftermath of Indira Gandhi's assassination which occurred on 31 October 1984.

Starring Vir Das and Soha Ali Khan, it released on 21 October 2016.

Plot 
On 31 October 1984, the Prime Minister of India gets assassinated by her Sikh Security Guards. Politicians use this incident to spark public hatred towards the Sikhs, labelling them as traitors. Devender Singh and his family are stuck in their house as their city plummets. In 24 hours of uncertain oscillations, helplessness and with their relatives dying and neighbours turning hostile, Devender's family seek help from their Hindu friends who live across town. As Pal, Tilak and Yogesh travel to save Devender's family, they come face-to-face with the destruction of humanity. They witness the carnage and the moral corruption that makes men turn into savages. In their attempt in ferrying Devender's family to safety, Pal, Tilak and Yogesh must face their own demons first.

Cast
 Soha Ali Khan as Tajinder Kaur
 Vir Das as Davinder Singh
 Akshat R Saluja as Luvleen
 Lakha Lakhwinder Singh as Yogesh
 Deepraj Rana as Pal
 Vineet Sharma as Tilak
 Nagesh Bhonsle as Inspector Dahiya
 Daya Shankar Pandey
 Pritam Kagne
 Maneet Vaghadia as Gudia
 Sezal Sharma

Release
31st October had its official screening at the London Indian Film festival on 18 and 20 July 2015. It released in theatres on 21 October 2016.

Soundtrack
All the songs of 31st October are composed by Vijay Verma, while the lyrics are penned by Mehboob and Moazzam Azam. The album was released on 14 September 2016 under the Zee Music Company music label. The soundtrack consists of 8 tracks.

"Umeed" - Reprise Version - Babbu Maan

"Yaqeen" - Sonu Nigam

"Andhere" - Asha Bhosle

"Rabb De Bande" - Harshdeep Kaur

"Umeed" - Javed Ali

"Maula" - Vijay Verma, Ustad Ghulam Mustafa Khan

"Andhere" - Male Version - Vijay Verma

"Yaqeen" - Reprise Version - Mohammad Salamat

References

External links 

 
 

2015 films
Indian action drama films
Indian historical drama films
History of India on film
2010s Hindi-language films
Films based on 1984 anti-Sikh riots
Cultural depictions of Indira Gandhi
Fictional portrayals of the Delhi Police
Hindi-language drama films
2015 action drama films
2010s historical drama films